On June 13, 1970, President Richard Nixon established the President's Commission on Campus unrest, which became known as the Scranton Commission after its chairman, former Pennsylvania governor William Scranton.

Scranton was asked to study the dissent, disorder, and violence breaking out on college and university campuses, particularly the national student strike that was then going on.  The student strike was both a general protest against the Vietnam War and a specific response to the American invasion of Cambodia and the killings of four students at Kent State University in Ohio.  Other violent confrontations, such as the killing of two students at Jackson State College in Mississippi, also incited public and administration concern.

Scranton concluded that, "It is true that the amount of campus disruption and violence certainly was much less in the period when the war seemed to be going in the direction of terminating and people were beginning to come back to the United States, for example, late last fall, this last winter, and early spring. And certainly it got much stronger after the Cambodia. We all know that, after the Cambodian invasion. So the less extenuation there is of American participation and the more return of men, the more helpful it is, of course."

The Commission issued its findings in a September 1970 report. It concluded that the shootings at Kent State were unjustified. The report said: Even if the guardsmen faced danger, it was not a danger that called for lethal force. The 61 shots by 28 guardsmen certainly cannot be justified. Apparently, no order to fire was given, and there was inadequate fire control discipline on Blanket Hill. The Kent State tragedy must mark the last time that, as a matter of course, loaded rifles are issued to guardsmen confronting student demonstrators.

Members
The members of the commission were:
William W. Scranton, former governor of Pennsylvania (chairman)
James F. Ahern, chief of police, New Haven, Connecticut
Erwin D. Canham, editor-in-chief, Christian Science Monitor
James E. Cheek, president, Howard University
Lieutenant General Benjamin O. Davis Jr., United States Air Force (retired), Director, Civil Aviation Security, United States Department of Transportation
Martha A. Derthick, Emerita Professor, University of Virginia
Bayless Manning, dean, Stanford Law School
Revius O. Ortique Jr., attorney-at-law, New Orleans, Louisiana
Joseph Rhodes Jr., junior fellow, Harvard University

See also
Opposition to the Vietnam War

References

Further reading
 An unpublished manuscript discussing the proceedings of the Scranton Commission at length.

1970 riots
1970 in the United States
Riots and civil disorder in the United States
Opposition to United States involvement in the Vietnam War
Student protests in the United States
Campus Unrest, President's Commission on
Presidency of Richard Nixon